The Eagle Point Bridge was a very narrow two-lane automobile bridge that connected urban Dubuque, Iowa, and rural Grant County, Wisconsin. It was part of the US 61/US 151 route, and was a toll bridge. After the new Dubuque–Wisconsin Bridge was built in 1983, the Eagle Point Bridge was torn down. At the end, the toll was ten cents, both ways, collected on the Iowa side.

In 1968, the highway designation was removed from the bridge and a four-ton load limit was put in place.
The bridge was still structurally sound after the new bridge was built, leading some to ask the bridge be kept open as a pedestrian or special use bridge, but the state of Iowa still tore the bridge down.

Several years after the demolition of the bridge, a restaurant known as the Tollbridge Inn was constructed at what was the Iowa end of the bridge. The restaurant operated for a number of years, until it was torn down to make way for future development.

The bridge was extensively documented in 1982 for the Historic American Engineering Record, archived at the Library of Congress. The documentation includes 81 black-and-white photos and 39 data pages detailing construction and history of the bridge.

See also
List of crossings of the Upper Mississippi River
List of bridges documented by the Historic American Engineering Record in Iowa
List of bridges documented by the Historic American Engineering Record in Wisconsin

Notes

External links

Buildings and structures in Dubuque, Iowa
Transportation in Dubuque, Iowa
Bridges completed in 1902
Demolished bridges in the United States
U.S. Route 61
Road bridges in Iowa
Road bridges in Wisconsin
U.S. Route 51
Bridges of the United States Numbered Highway System
Historic American Engineering Record in Iowa
Historic American Engineering Record in Wisconsin
Interstate vehicle bridges in the United States
Former toll bridges in Iowa
Former toll bridges in Wisconsin
Bridges in Dubuque County, Iowa
1902 establishments in Iowa
1902 establishments in Wisconsin
1983 disestablishments in Iowa
1983 disestablishments in Wisconsin